Freedom's Path is a 2022 historical war drama film written, directed and produced by Brett Smith in his feature length debut. It stars Gerran Howell, RJ Cyler, and Ewen Bremner. Based on the American Civil War, it won multiple film festival awards in 2022 and had a limited theatrical run from February 3, 2023.

Synopsis 
A Union soldier is rescued by a free Black man and his friends, who run a portion of the Underground Railroad. Meanwhile, a ruthless slave catcher is looking to bring them down.

Cast
 Gerran Howell as William
 RJ Cyler as Kitch 
 Ewen Bremner as Silas 
 Harrison Gilbertson as Lewis 
 Mia Tucker as Nora
 Carol Sutton as Caddy
 Afemo Omilani as Ellis Freeman
 Steven Swadling as Jake Nilsson
 Thomas Jefferson Byrd as Abner

Production
The film is based on a short of the same name that Brett Smith released in 2015. The feature length film was produced by Rocket Soul Studios and 1812 Films, with Soulidifly Productions, Rock Hill Studios, Room In The Sky Films and Chicago Media Angels. Producers were AJ Winslow, Jim Pidgeon, Neko Sparks and Steven Swadling. The film has a promotional partnership with Allen Media Group.

Filming
Principal photography took place in October 2019. It was largely filmed in and around Fayetteville with filming locations including Prairie Grove Battlefield Park, War Eagle Mill, Lincoln, and Cane Hill.

Release 
The film premiered at the Cinequest Film & Creativity Festival on April 15, 2022. The film was distributed by Xenon Pictures in 128 AMC and Regal Cinemas theaters on February 3, 2023 with part of ticket sales be donated to Historically Black Colleges and Universities.

Reception
In September 2022 the film won the  Director’s Choice award at the Gig Harbor Film Festival in Washington State. It also Audience Award at both the Cinequest San Jose Festival and Fayetteville Film Festival in 2022. It won the ‘Best of Fest’ award at the Lone Star Film Festival, along with the ‘Festival Award’ at the San Diego International Film Festival and the Special Jury Prize at the St. Louis International Film Festival, all also in 2022.

References

External links

2022 films
Films shot in Arkansas
American war drama films
American historical films
2020s English-language films
2020s American films
2020s war films
2020s historical films
American Civil War films
Anti-war films 
Films about American slavery